Baltimore was launched in Maryland in 1810. She was commissioned at Baltimore as a letter of marque on 26 August 1812. Captain Edward Veasey sailed on 12 September with a cargo for Bordeaux.

Then on 28 September Baltimore captured Point Share, which had been sailing from Barbados to  Newfoundland with a cargo of dried codfish. Veasey took Point Shares master and crew on board Baltimore and sent his prize into Baltimore with a prize crew. Point Shares arrived at Baltimore on 20 October. By then, Baltimore herself had already fallen prey to the Royal Navy.

In early October Baltimore was in the Bay of Biscay, near Santander when on 7 October she encountered a British naval squadron, which captured her. The report of her capture noted that she was carrying coffee, sugar, and hides. Lloyd's List reported that she had arrived at Portsmouth on 1 November.

In 1813 Edward Veasey became captain of the even more unfortunate privateer . Then in 1814 he became captain of the privateer schooner , which captured 22 vessels.

Notes, citations, and references
Notes

Citations

References
 
 
 

1810 ships
Ships built in Baltimore
Captured ships